Razina is a rural locality (a village) in Verkh-Invenskoye Rural Settlement, Kudymkarsky District, Perm Krai, Russia. The population was 116 as of 2010. There are 8 streets.

Geography 
Razina is located 20 km southwest of Kudymkar (the district's administrative centre) by road. Sidorova is the nearest rural locality.

References 

Rural localities in Kudymkarsky District